The University of Maryland Global Campus (UMGC, formerly University of Maryland University College) is a public university in Adelphi, Maryland. It is the largest of the University System of Maryland campuses. Established in 1947, UMGC focuses on online education in its classes and programs on campus in its Academic Center in Largo and at satellite campuses across the Washington–Baltimore metropolitan area, throughout Maryland, and across the world.

UMGC serves over 90,000 students worldwide and is one of the largest distance-learning institutions in the world. UMGC is open to all applicants for undergraduate programs, and is among the top 10 recipients of the federal G.I. Bill benefits. The university offers 120 academic programs in instructor-led and online classes, including bachelor's, master's, and doctoral degrees, as well as undergraduate and graduate certificates. UMGC is accredited by the Middle States Commission on Higher Education.

History
 UMGC is an outgrowth of the evening program for adults at the University of Maryland, which began in the 1920s. In 1947, the College of Special and Continuation Studies (CSCS) was established. In 1959, The CSCS became the University of Maryland University College (UMUC). In 1970, UMUC became an independent institution, and it became a member of the University System of Maryland in 1988.

UMUC formerly had an international campus in Schwäbisch Gmünd, Germany, (near Stuttgart), until 2002. It also ran a two-year residential campus in Munich, Germany, from 1950 to 1992, which then moved to Augsburg, Germany, from 1993 to 1994, and then to Mannheim, Germany, in 1995 until it finally closed in 2005. The residential campus offered a two-year associate degree and mainly served high school graduate children of U.S. military and government personnel stationed in Europe.

In 2008 UMUC offered courses on over 130 military installations at locations throughout Europe and the Middle East, as well as in Asia. In 2004, UMUC shared the ICDE Prize of Excellence from the International Council for Open and Distance Education. In FY 2015, UMGC offered on-site classes in 20 countries throughout the world, enrolling almost 11,000 students, in Asia and Europe.

University name

UMUC was a college in the traditional American sense of the word, albeit one associated with a university—hence, "University College." The "University of Maryland" prefix indicated the historical entity to which the college belonged originally. In the university's name, "University College" represented "the specialized concentration on professional development," while "University of Maryland" represented the affiliation of the university with the University System of Maryland.

When UMUC first opened in 1947, the school was named College of Special and Continuation Studies to distinguish it as an institution independent from the University of Maryland, College Park. In 1953, Raymond Ehrensberger, chancellor of the institution at that time, wanted to change the name to something more meaningful and less cumbersome for people to say and remember. Early suggestions for the name included College of General Studies, College of Adult Education and University College.

In 1959, Chancellor Ehrensberger persuaded the University System of Maryland's Board of Regents to change the name to University of Maryland University College. The name "University College" was adopted from the British university system to depict an educational institution offering "courses and programs from all academic departments outside the university's walls and normal class times." Therefore, UMUC was not a division of the University of Maryland, College Park, but rather a separate institution within the University System of Maryland.

In 2019, the university announced that its name would change to "University of Maryland Global Campus" accompanied by a half-billion dollar national marketing campaign to expand the school's global outreach. The name change request was submitted as SB 201 and HB 319 in the 2019 regular session of the Maryland General Assembly. The name change was enacted into law on April 18, 2019 when the bill was signed by Maryland Governor Larry Hogan.

Academics
UMGC is one of the largest providers of distance education in the United States. Courses are delivered in traditional classroom settings, as well as online. Even before the advent of online education by way of the World Wide Web, UMGC was a distance education pioneer and offered distance learning using its WebTycho interface by way of dial-up access. UMGC later adopted the use of the Web for connectivity to its online classrooms, as well as using television and correspondence courses to deliver course content.

Undergraduate
The Undergraduate School offers more than 30 bachelor's degree programs and undergraduate certificates, awarded in business management, computers/information technology, communications, criminal justice/legal studies, and social sciences. Undergraduate students can earn credit through classroom-based and online courses or through the Prior Learning programs. The Undergraduate program serves as a continuation of the Community Colleges of Maryland and elsewhere. The Prior Learning programs offer an escalated degree option for education and training completed in the workplace or military. This program provides general education credits that can be applied towards a degree at UMGC.

Graduate
The Graduate School offers more than 55 master's degree programs, graduate certificates, and doctoral degrees. Most graduate programs are available in both classroom and online formats. Several master's degrees are available in an accelerated Executive format or executive online format only.

Military Base Deployed locations
UMGC offers face-to-face courses and support in Bahrain, Djibouti, Egypt, Kuwait, Qatar, and the United Arab Emirates, Australia, Guam, Japan, Okinawa, Singapore, South Korea, Diego Garcia, Spain.

Campuses

Headquarters/main campus

The headquarters for UMGC is located in Adelphi, Maryland near the campus of the University of Maryland, College Park. Until late 2000, the UMGC headquarters was listed in College Park, Maryland. In an attempt to establish its own identity as an independent university, UMGC changed its postal address to Adelphi, an unincorporated community that borders College Park. The address change with the U.S. Postal Service involved no physical move of people and facilities. The marketing decision to change its postal address was one of many undertaken by UMGC to distinguish the university as one of the largest distance-education centers, with over 248,000 students enrolled worldwide in FY 2015.

Academic buildings
Academic Center at Largo
Student & Faculty Services Center (SFSC) (Headquarters)

UMGC purchased for $38 million its new headquarters building in Largo, Maryland, which was once the headquarters site for Hechinger and corporate offices of Raytheon. UMGC retrofitted its new headquarters to meet "green" building requirements for LEED certification. UMGC followed the same process as it did to achieve LEED certification in 2005 for its Inn & Conference Center, which became the first hotel complex in the United States to achieve certification as a green building.

UMGC began relocating its academic departments and offices to its new Academic Center at Largo in September 2009, and completed the process in 2010. UMGC began offering on campus classes at its new Academic Center in the Spring 2010 semester.

Satellite campuses
UMGC operates satellite campuses at more than 140 worldwide locations, including across the Baltimore-Washington Metropolitan Area, the United States, Europe, and Asia.

Baltimore-Washington metropolitan area
In the greater Baltimore-Washington Metropolitan Area, daytime, evening and weekend classes are held at 21 locations, including holding many of its classes at the University of Maryland, College Park campus. The satellite campuses offer varying academic services, including advising, computing, and library facilities (extensive library services are available to distance education students via the University's Information and Library Services department).

UMGC operates a facility in Dorsey, Maryland adjacent to the Dorsey MARC Train Station. In partnership with Maryland community colleges and other University System of Maryland institutions, UMGC offers courses and degree programs at several higher education centers throughout the state. In conjunction with the College of Southern Maryland, it operates the Waldorf Center for Higher Education in Waldorf, Maryland. A consortium of universities led by Anne Arundel Community College, including UMGC, operates a higher education center adjacent to Arundel Mills mall in Hanover, Maryland. In addition, the University offers courses at the Universities at Shady Grove and University System of Maryland at Hagerstown, which are part of the University System of Maryland.

Global locations
In Europe, the Middle East, and Asia, UMGC offers courses on military bases for service members, contractors, Federal employees, and their families. In addition to distance learning via the Web, the university offers on-site, instructor-led classes at 130 overseas US military bases in 22 countries throughout the world. Overseas instruction is coordinated through its European Division, which covers USCENTCOM installations in the Middle East, and Asian Divisions. UMGC divisional headquarters are located in Kaiserslautern, Germany (following the closure of United States Army Garrison Heidelberg) and on Yokota Air Base, Tokyo, Japan, respectively.

Student profile
UMGC specializes in distance learning for adult, non-traditional students in Maryland, across the country, and around the world by operating satellite campuses and offering online instruction. In FY 2015 the university enrolled almost 52,000 active-duty service members at over 140 worldwide locations. In FY 2015, more than 32,000 Marylanders attended UMGC.

About three-quarters of the undergraduate students attend part-time. Over ninety-two percent of UMGC students are employed full-time. The majority of undergraduate students are female. The median age of stateside undergraduate students is 31. Almost two-thirds of the graduate MBA students are married, half are female, and over a third are minorities. Over a third of UMGC's stateside students were African-American, and this minority group earned over a third of the degrees awarded by the university.

Rankings and awards
UMGC was ranked #1 in The Military Times “Best for Vets: Colleges 2015” list of top online and nontraditional schools in 2015. Military Times “Best for Vets” is one of the most respected and comprehensive rankings for veterans who are considering higher education. The publication looked at U.S. Department of Education statistics on student success and academic quality, as well as areas such as university culture, student support, and academic policies in evaluating hundreds of schools.

In 2011, UMGC received the Institution Award from the Council of College and Military Educators (CCME), a not-for-profit organization founded to promote, encourage and deliver quality education to service members and their families in all branches of the U.S. armed services. The Institution Award is given to a college or university that supplies quality education programs to the armed services. CCME selected UMGC due to its dedication, leadership and numerous accomplishments in providing quality, voluntary off-duty education programs.

U.S. News & World Report ranked UMGC #131-171 in Regional Universities North for its 2022 edition of Best Colleges.

Notable alumni

Academia

Arts and entertainment

Business

Government and public policy

Sports

Notable students

Notable faculty

References

External links
 

 
Educational institutions established in 1947
Universities and colleges in Prince George's County, Maryland
1947 establishments in Maryland
Global